Souvenir: The Singles 2004–2012 is a compilation album by the English indie rock band Kaiser Chiefs. The album features almost all of the singles released by the band from 2004 to 2012 (minus "Sink That Ship", a double A-Side), as well as a new track titled "Listen to Your Head" and the previously unreleased "On The Run". It was released in the UK on 4 June 2012. The version of 'You Can Have It All' on this compilation is the 'light orchestral' version previously only available on the song's exclusive 7-inch single, despite not being labelled as such on the packaging.

The album art was created by Hitchin-based photo-realist artist Sarah Graham, using oil paints.

Track listing

References

2012 greatest hits albums
Kaiser Chiefs albums